Camel's Hump Natural Area is a protected area in the U.S. state of Vermont. The natural area, wholly contained within Camel's Hump State Park, straddles the ridge of the Green Mountains in Chittenden and Washington counties, in the towns of Duxbury, Huntington, Fayston, Bolton, and Buels Gore. Administered by the Vermont Department of Forests, Parks and Recreation, Camel's Hump Natural Area is the largest natural area in Vermont.

Description

Camel's Hump Natural Area was created in 1965, with significant additions made in 1969 and 1995. The focal point of the natural area is Camel's Hump, the highest mountain in Camel's Hump State Park. The natural area consists of the following sub-areas:

Biodiversity

Camel's Hump Natural Area includes  of alpine tundra, one of three such plant communities in Vermont. The natural area also supports an undisturbed subalpine boreal forest of balsam fir, red spruce, and heartleaf paper birch. There are at least 10 species of animals and 24 species of plants in the natural area thought to be rare or very rare. Some of these are protected by the Vermont endangered and threatened species rule, including Boott's rattlesnake-root (Nabalus boottii, generically known as white lettuce), bearberry willow (Salix uva-ursi), lesser wintergreen (Pyrola minor), alpine sweetgrass (Anthoxanthum monticola]), and squashberry (Viburnum edule).

History

In 1911, Joseph Battell, a publisher, environmentalist, and philanthropist from Middlebury, donated  of forest land surrounding Camel's Hump to the State of Vermont. The deed declared that the "trees growing on the land herein conveyed are not to be cut…and the whole forest is to be preserved in a primeval state." A half century later, in 1965, the state created Camel's Hump Natural Area, a  protected area that included a portion of the Battell lands within its boundary.

In 1969, as a by-product of creating Camel's Hump State Park, the State of Vermont designated an ecological area that included all state lands in Camel's Hump Forest Reserve above  plus all land in the Gleason Brook watershed above .

In 1995, the State of Vermont acquired the  Phen Basin parcel in Fayston. Approximately 80% of the parcel was designated as an Ecological Protection Zone intended to foster the conservation of wildlife, habitats, forestry values, public recreational opportunities, and scenic resources.

Bibliography

References

Vermont natural areas
Protected areas of Chittenden County, Vermont
Protected areas of Washington County, Vermont
Duxbury, Vermont
Huntington, Vermont
Fayston, Vermont
Bolton, Vermont
Buels Gore, Vermont
1965 establishments in Vermont
Protected areas established in 1965